WCO may refer to:

Water Conservation Order
Weak Crossover
West Coast offense
Wisconsin Chamber Orchestra
World Council of Optometry
World Customs Organization
World Culture Open